The Eastern Busway, also known as AMETI (the Auckland Manukau Eastern Transport Initiative), is Auckland's first urban busway under construction in the southeastern suburbs of Panmure, Pakuranga and Botany, in Auckland. Stage two of the Eastern Busway between Panmure and Pakuranga was opened in December 2021.

Background 
In early 2018, preliminary demolition and removal of some properties in Panmure took place, and in October 2018, removal of 61 remaining properties began. Auckland Council's transport and property management CCO's, Auckland Transport and Panuku respectively, had worked to re-house affected owners and tenants.

The removal of the 61 properties from Lagoon Drive and Pakuranga Road was completed in early 2019, allowing construction of the lanes of the Panmure-Pakuranga section to start.

In March 2020 work on the Project was suspended as a result of the COVID-19 pandemic. Auckland Council applied to Infrastructure Industry Reference Group
 for project funding during lockdown.

A new bridge, dedicated to the busway lanes, was built across the Tāmaki Estuary alongside the existing Panmure Bridge. On completion, the busway is expected to account for 35 percent of all journeys across Panmure Bridge, about 22,000 bus passengers per day.

Project 

Stage 1: Construction of Panmure Station building and construction of Te Horeta Road is underway on 25 September 2013 (Completed)

Stage 2: Construction of busway between Panmure and Pakuranga (Completed)

Stage 3: Pakuranga town centre improvements and busway to Botany (Planning and public interaction)

Side-projects: Improving Sylvia Park for cycling and walking infrastructure

See also
 Eastern Transport Corridor – a route reserved for an eastern motorway that was politically unpopular and led to the busway project
 Northern Busway, Auckland
 Public transport in Auckland

References

Busways
Transport in Auckland